Bobtales is an Australian animated series of aboriginal dreamtime stories produced in Perth, Western Australia in 1997 and aired in 1998.

Thirteen 5-minute episodes were produced by independent film company Gripping Film and Graphics and the Western Australian Aboriginal Media Association in Western Australia, with funding from Screenwest, Film Australia, and SBS Independent. The series is distributed within Australia and world wide by Screen Australia.

Episodes
Waitj and the Djindong
The Trials of Yorna
Younger and Maak (Kangaroo and Moon)
Legend of the Southern Cross
How the Parrots got their Colours
Three Springs
How the Echidna Got its Quills
The Emu, Brolga and Eagle
The Kingfisher Tribe
The Dove and the Mountain Devil
Moon Stories
Legend of the Kwilena
How the Numbat Got Its Stripes / How the Chuditch Has Spots and the Emu Can't Fly

References
 https://web.archive.org/web/20080723005826/http://www.racismnoway.com.au/library/bibliography/bib57.html
 https://web.archive.org/web/20121010024725/http://ftvdb.bfi.org.uk/sift/title/694541
 https://web.archive.org/web/19990223213055/http://www.iinet.net.au/~althomp/bob/

External links

Special Broadcasting Service original programming
1998 Australian television series debuts
1998 Australian television series endings
1990s Australian animated television series
Australian children's animated television series
Indigenous Australian television series